Pachyagrotis is a genus of moths of the Noctuidae family, first described by Charles Boursin in 1953. The type species is Pachyagrotis ankarensis .

Species
Species accepted in the genus according to IRMNG are:
 Pachyagrotis ankarensis Rebel, 1933
 Pachyagrotis benigna Corti, 1926
 Pachyagrotis flagrans Püngeler, 1925
 Pachyagrotis libanotica Corti & Draudt, 1933
 Pachyagrotis tischendorfi (Püngeler, 1925)
 Pachyagrotis wichgrafi'' Corti & Draudt, 1933

References

Noctuinae